Events in the year 1999 in Namibia.

Incumbents 

 President: Sam Nujoma
 Prime Minister: Hage Geingob
 Chief Justice of Namibia: Ismael Mahomed (until March?), Johan Strydom (from March)

Events 

 10 July – The Lusaka Ceasefire Agreement was signed by President Sam Nujoma and other African heads of state in Lusaka, Zambia.

Deaths

References 

 
1990s in Namibia
Years of the 20th century in Namibia
Namibia
Namibia